Michael Samuel may refer to:

 Michael Samuel (footballer) (born 1980), Dutch footballer
 Michael Samuel (philanthropist) (born 1952). British businessman and philanthropist